Reynolds Store is an unincorporated community in northern Frederick County, Virginia. Reynolds Store is located along the North Frederick Pike (U.S. Route 522) at its crossroads with Cumberland Trail Road (VA 694) and Reynolds Road. The post office of neighboring Cross Junction serves the community.

Historic sites 
Timber Ridge Church
Wesley Chapel (Wesley United Methodist Church)

References

Unincorporated communities in Frederick County, Virginia
Unincorporated communities in Virginia